Freda Claire Guttman Bain (born 1934) is a Canadian multidisciplinary artist and activist.

Biography 
Guttman was born March 16, 1934, in Montreal, Quebec. She studied briefly at McGill University, where she met and dated Leonard Cohen. She would go on to illustrate Cohen's first book of poetry, Let Us Compare Mythologies. Guttman moved to Rhode Island, where she received a degree from the Rhode Island School of Design in 1956. She also studied at Concordia University and the Saidye Bronfman Centre. From 1972 to 1983, she taught at Concordia University in Montreal.

Work 
Guttman's work combines elements of politics, economics, sociology and ecology. Her work has been exhibited in Canada, the United States, Europe,  Mexico and Nicaragua.

Since the early 1980s, Guttman has been involved as an activist in a number of political causes.

Exhibitions 

 1976 : Freda Guttman Bain, Galerie Powerhouse, Montréal
 1986: Guatemala! Le chemin de la guerre (multimedia works), Chambre Blanche
1989: The Global Menu / Le Menu Global, Space Gallery, Toronto
1989: Cris et chuchotements, DAZIBAO, Montreal
1990: The Global Menu / Le Menu Global, OBORO, Montreal
1995: Cassandra : un opéra en quatre actes, OBORO, Montreal
1998: Cassandra : un opéra en quatre actes, Galerie Sequence, Chicoutimi

Collections 
Guttman's work is included in the collections of:
 the National Gallery of Canada,
 the Musée national des beaux-arts du Québec  
 the Agnes Etherington Art Centre
 the Art Gallery of Guelph

References

1934 births
Living people
Artists from Montreal
21st-century Canadian women artists
20th-century Canadian women artists